Chester Dominican Friary was a friary in Cheshire, England.

References

Monasteries in Cheshire
Dominican monasteries in England